The 2013 Stanley Cup Finals was the championship series of the National Hockey League's (NHL)  season, and the conclusion of the 2013 Stanley Cup playoffs. The Western Conference playoff champion Chicago Blackhawks defeated the Eastern Conference playoff champion Boston Bruins in six games to win their fifth Stanley Cup in team history. The Blackhawks also became just the eighth team to win both the Cup and the Presidents' Trophy (as the team with the best regular season record) in the same season. Chicago's Patrick Kane was awarded the Conn Smythe Trophy as the Most Valuable Player of the playoffs.

Due to a lockout that both shortened and delayed the start of the regular season, the 2013 Cup Finals began on June 12, and lasted until June 24–tying the lockout impacted  for the latest in June that the Stanley Cup was awarded. This was the first Stanley Cup Finals series between two Original Six teams since , and the seventh since its first expansion in 1967. It also marked the first time these two teams have met in the Stanley Cup Finals.

In game six of the finals, trailing the Boston Bruins 2–1 with 76 seconds left in the third period, the Blackhawks scored two goals in 17 seconds to win the series 4–2. It was the first Finals series since 2004 to be tied after two games. It was also the first Stanley Cup Finals since  to feature three overtime games, including the fifth longest game in Finals history. This series was the last time to date that a Presidents' Trophy winner has won the Stanley Cup.

Paths to the Finals

Boston Bruins

The Bruins entered the season without the services of goalie Tim Thomas, the Conn Smythe Trophy winner during Boston's 2011 championship. It was announced on June 3, 2012, that he planned on taking a year off from hockey. Thomas was eventually traded to the New York Islanders on February 7, 2013. Tuukka Rask succeeded Thomas as the Bruins' starting goalie. Another of the Bruins' major trades was sending Benoit Pouliot to the Tampa Bay Lightning. Then on April 2, 2013, with about a month left in the lockout-shortened regular season, Boston acquired veteran Jaromir Jagr from the Dallas Stars.

Boston finished the lockout-shortened regular season with 62 points, finishing in second place in the Northeast Division, and the fourth seed in the Eastern Conference. Throughout the regular season, the Bruins and the Montreal Canadiens were neck-and-neck in the division, but the Bruins lost their last game to the Ottawa Senators, a contest that was postponed until the end of the regular season due to the Boston Marathon bombing. In the first round of the playoffs, Boston rallied from a 4–1 third period deficit in game seven to defeat the Toronto Maple Leafs in overtime. The Bruins then eliminated the New York Rangers in five games, and then swept the top seeded Pittsburgh Penguins in the Conference Finals.

Chicago Blackhawks

This was the Chicago Blackhawks' twelfth appearance in the Stanley Cup Finals, and they sought their fifth Cup championship overall and their first one since . In the 2011 and 2012 playoffs, the Blackhawks were eliminated in the first round.

The Blackhawks began the lockout-shortened regular season by setting the NHL record for most games to start a season without a regulation loss (24). Chicago finally recorded their first regulation loss in their 25th game of the season: a 6–2 defeat to the Colorado Avalanche. The Blackhawks finished the regular season with the best record at 77 points, and won their second Presidents' Trophy in team history, as well as the Central Division championship. In the first round of the playoffs, the Blackhawks defeated the Minnesota Wild in five games. Chicago then had to come back from a 3–1 game deficit to defeat the Detroit Red Wings in overtime of game seven. Then in the Conference Finals, the Blackhawks defeated the defending 2012 Cup champion Los Angeles Kings in five games.

Game summaries
 Number in parenthesis represents the player's total in goals or assists to that point of the entire four rounds of the playoffs

Game one

The Blackhawks rallied from a 3–1 third period deficit in game one to defeat the Bruins in triple-overtime, 4–3. This was the 24th longest NHL overtime game, and the fifth longest in the history of the Stanley Cup Finals. Milan Lucic scored at 13:11 of the first period and 00:51 of the second period to give the Bruins a 2–0 lead. At 03:08 of the second period, Chicago rookie Brandon Saad scored his first career playoff goal, ending Boston goalie Tuukka Rask's shutout streak of 149:36 (dating back to the conference finals), and cutting Boston's lead to 2–1. Chicago then had a 5-on-3 for 1:17 midway through the second period, but could not get a shot on goal. The Bruins then increased their lead to 3–1 when Patrice Bergeron scored a power play goal at 06:09 of the third period. But Dave Bolland and Johnny Oduya scored in 4:14 apart to tie the game. In the overtime periods, the Blackhawks were penalized twice for too many men on the ice, but Boston was unable to score on those two ensuing power plays. The game finally ended at 12:08 of the third overtime period when Michal Rozsival's shot from the point deflected off of Bolland, then Andrew Shaw, and past Rask into the Boston net.

Game two

The Bruins tied the series with a 2–1 overtime victory in game two. This was the third consecutive overtime game for the Blackhawks (dating back to the conference finals), and the second consecutive Cup Finals in which the first two games went into overtime. In the first period, Chicago had 19 shots on goal compared to Boston's 4, but only scored on Patrick Sharp's goal at 11:22. Seventy seconds later, a goal by the Blackhawks' Marian Hossa was disallowed after officials blew the play dead prior to the puck crossing the Bruins' goal line. Boston's Chris Kelly then scored his first goal of the playoffs at 14:58 of the second period to tie the game. After a scoreless third period, Daniel Paille won the game for the Bruins at 13:48 of overtime; the Blackhawks' Brent Seabrook sent the puck around the end boards in the Chicago zone, but Brandon Bollig could not push it out to centre ice, allowing Adam McQuaid to steal the loose puck and feed it to Tyler Seguin, who then passed it to Paille.

Game three

Boston goalie Tuukka Rask stopped all 28 Chicago shots in the Bruins' 2–0 victory in game three. Daniel Paille scored Boston's first goal at 02:13 of the second period. Patrice Bergeron then scored a power play goal at 14:05 of the second period, just seconds after the Bruins' 5-on-3 advantage expired. The Blackhawks' Marian Hossa was scratched from the game; Chicago head coach Joel Quenneville later said after the game that Hossa did not play due to an upper-body injury.

Game four

 After only 12 total goals were scored in the first three games, game four featured a series high 11 total goals. In the first period, Chicago's Michal Handzus scored a short-handed goal at 06:48 before Boston's Rich Peverley tied the game on a power play goal at 14:43. Five total goals were then scored in the second period. Jonathan Toews deflected Michal Rozsival's shot into the Boston net at 6:48 to give the Blackhawks a 2–1 lead. Chicago then scored again at 8:41: Bryan Bickell's shot was stopped by Tuukka Rask, but Patrick Kane grabbed the rebound from the other side and shot it into the net before the Boston goalie could recover. Milan Lucic cut the lead, 3–2, at 14:43 after shooting a rebound past Chicago goalie Corey Crawford, but Chicago scored right back at 15:32 with Marcus Kruger's goal on a 2-on-1 breakaway. At 17:22, the Bruins scored their second power play goal after Zdeno Chara's shot deflected over the net, hit the glass, then eventually bounced into the crease where Patrice Bergeron tapped it into the net before Crawford could find the puck. In the third period, Bergeron tied the game, 4–4, at 2:05. The Blackhawks then scored their first power play goal of the series with Patrick Sharp's score at 11:19, but Boston answered 55 seconds later with Johnny Boychuk's equalizer. At 09:51 of overtime, Brent Seabrook scored from the point through traffic to give the Blackhawks a 6–5 victory in game four to even the series at 2. All five Bruins goals were shot to the glove side of Crawford, but the Blackhawks never once trailed in this game.

Game five

Patrick Kane scored two goals in the Blackhawks' 3–1 victory in game five. Chicago built a 2–0 lead with Kane's goals at 17:27 of the first period and 05:13 of the second. Boston's Zdeno Chara cut the score to 2–1 at 03:40 of the third period, but Chicago goalie Corey Crawford stopped 24 of 25 Bruins shots, and Dave Bolland added an empty net goal in the waning seconds of the game. Boston's Patrice Bergeron left the game in the second period and was later taken to the hospital for observation, while Chicago's Jonathan Toews suffered an upper body injury and did not play in the third period.

Game six

With Chicago holding a 3–2 series lead heading into game six, the desperate Bruins outshot the Blackhawks 12–6 in the first period, with the Bruins ending the period up 1–0 due to Chris Kelly's goal. However, Chicago would fight back in the second period, as Blackhawks captain Jonathan Toews scored on a breakaway while shorthanded to tie the game (Toews' goal would be recorded as an even strength goal, as it entered the net just after Andrew Shaw's penalty expired). The teams entered the third period with the game tied 1–1. However, Milan Lucic would score at 12:11 of the third period to put the Bruins in front again. With the Bruins clinging onto a 2–1 lead late in the third period, the Blackhawks pulled goalie Corey Crawford for the extra attacker. This resulted in Bryan Bickell scoring the game-tying goal with 76 seconds remaining in the game on a feed from Jonathan Toews. Thus, with the score tied 2–2, it appeared the Finals would go to overtime for the fourth time. However, only 17 seconds after Bickell's goal, Dave Bolland scored what proved to be the series-winning goal, as the Bruins were unable to get an equalizer in the final minute with goalie Tuukka Rask on the bench. Bolland's goal at 19:01 of the third period broke the record for the latest Stanley Cup game-winner scored in regulation.

Officials

Referees: Wes McCauley (Canada), Dan O'Halloran (Canada), Chris Rooney (United States), Brad Watson (Canada)

Linesmen: Shane Heyer (Canada), Brian Murphy (United States), Pierre Racicot (Canada), Jay Sharrers (Canada)

Television
In Canada, the series was televised in English on CBC and in French on the cable network RDS. The NBC Sports Group's coverage in the United States was different from previous seasons: the NBC broadcast network televised game one and then the final four games, while the NBC Sports Network broadcast games two and three.

Team rosters
Years indicated in boldface under the "Finals appearance" column signify that the player won the Stanley Cup in the given year.

Boston Bruins

Chicago Blackhawks

Stanley Cup engraving

The 2013 Stanley Cup was presented to Blackhawks captain Jonathan Toews by NHL Commissioner Gary Bettman, following the Blackhawks' 3–2 win over the Bruins in the sixth game of the finals.

The following Blackhawks players and staff had their names engraved on the Stanley Cup

2012–13 Chicago Blackhawks

References

External links
 Official Site

2012–13 NHL season
Boston Bruins games
Chicago Blackhawks games
Stanley Cup Finals
Stanley Cup Finals
Stanley Cup Finals
2010s in Chicago
Stanley Cup Finals
Ice hockey competitions in Boston
Ice hockey competitions in Chicago
 
Stanley Cup Finals